Joseph Nechvatal (born January 15, 1951)  is an American post-conceptual digital artist and art theoretician who creates computer-assisted paintings and computer animations, often using custom-created computer viruses.

Life and work

Joseph Nechvatal was born in Chicago. He studied fine art and philosophy at Southern Illinois University Carbondale, Cornell University and Columbia University. He earned a Doctor of Philosophy in Philosophy of Art and Technology at the Planetary Collegium at University of Wales, Newport and has taught art theory and art history at the School of Visual Arts. He has had many solo exhibitions, including one in Berlin

His work in the early 1980s chiefly consisted of postminimalist gray graphite drawings that were often photomechanically enlarged. Beginning in 1979 he became associated with the artist group Colab, organized the Public Arts International/Free Speech series, he was a member of Colab in the 1980s and helped established the non-profit group ABC No Rio.  In 1983 he co-founded the avant-garde electronic art music audio project Tellus Audio Cassette Magazine. In 1984, Nechvatal began work on an opera called XS: The Opera Opus (1984-6) with the no wave musical composer Rhys Chatham.

He began using computers and robotics to make post-conceptual paintings in 1986  and later, in his signature work, began to employ self-created computer viruses. From 1991 to 1993, he was artist-in-residence at the Louis Pasteur Atelier in Arbois, France and at the Saline Royale/Ledoux Foundation's computer lab. There he worked on The Computer Virus Project, his first artistic experiment with computer viruses and computer virus animation. He exhibited computer-robotic paintings at Documenta 8 in 1987.

In 2002 he extended his experimentation into viral artificial life through a collaboration with the programmer Stephane Sikora of music2eye in a work called the Computer Virus Project II. 

Nechvatal has also created a noise music work called viral symphOny, a collaborative sound symphony created by using his computer virus software at the Institute for Electronic Arts at Alfred University.

From 1999 to 2013, Nechvatal taught art theories of immersive virtual reality and the viractual at the School of Visual Arts in New York City (SVA). A book of his collected essays entitled Towards an Immersive Intelligence: Essays on the Work of Art in the Age of Computer Technology and Virtual Reality  (1993–2006) was published by Edgewise Press in 2009. Also in 2009, his book Immersive Ideals / Critical Distances was published. In 2011, his book Immersion Into Noise was published by Open Humanities Press in conjunction with the University of Michigan Library's Scholarly Publishing Office.

Viractualism
Viractualism is an art theory concept developed by Nechvatal in 1999 from Ph.D. research  Nechvatal conducted at the University of Wales College. There he developed his concept of the viractual, which strives to create an interface between the actual and the virtual.

Footnotes

Further reading 
 John Johnston, The Allure of Machinic Life: Cybernetics, Artificial Life, and the New AI, MIT Press, 2008, cover
 Donald Kuspit, The Matrix of Sensations  VI: Digital Artists and the New Creative Renaissance
 Joline Blais and Jon Ippolito, The Edge of Art, Thames & Hudson Ltd, p. 213
 Frank Popper, From Technological to Virtual Art, MIT Press, pp. 120–123
 Johanna Drucker,  Joseph Nechvatal : Critical Pleasure
 Robert C. Morgan,  Voluptuary: An algorithic hermaphornology, Tema Celeste Magazine, volume #93, p. 94
 Bruce Wands, Art of the Digital Age, London: Thames & Hudson, p. 65
 Robert C. Morgan, Laminations of the Soul, Editions Antoine Candau, 1990, pp. 23–30
 Margot Lovejoy, Digital Currents: Art in the Electronic Age Routledge 2004
 Joseph Nechvatal, Immersive Excess in the Apse of Lascaux, Technonoetic Arts 3, no3. 2005
 Joseph Nechvatal. Immersion Into Noise. Open Humanities Press in conjunction with the University of Michigan Library's Scholarly Publishing Office. Ann Arbor. 2011
 Johanna Drucker, Joseph Nechvatal : Critical Pleasure, Redaktion Frank Berndt, 1996, pp. 10–13
 Mario Costa, Phenomenology of New Tech Arts, Artmedia, Salerno, 2005, p. 6 & pp. 36 – 38
 Dominique Moulon, L'art numerique: spectateur-acteuret vie artificielle, Les images numeriques #47-48, 2004, pp. 124–125
 Christine Buci-Glucksmann, L'art à l'époque virtuel, in Frontières esthétiques de l'art, Arts 8, Paris: L'Harmattan, 2004
 Brandon Taylor, Collage, Thames & Hudson Ltd, 2006, p. 221
 Dominique Moulon,   Conférence Report : Media Art in France, Un Point d'Actu, L'Art Numerique, pp. 124–125
 Edmond Couchot, Des Images, du temps et des machines, édité Actes Sud, 2007, pp. 263–264
 Fred Forest, Art et Internet, Editions Cercle D'Art / Imaginaire Mode d'Emploi, pp. 48 –51
 Wayne Enstice & Melody Peters, Drawing: Space, Form, & Expression, New Jersey: Prentice Hall, pp. 312–313
 Ellen K. Levy, Synthetic Lighting: Complex Simulations of Nature, Photography Quarterly (#88) 2004, pp. 7–9
 Marie-Paule Nègre, Des artistes en leur monde, volume 2, la Gazette de l'Hotel Drout, 2008, pp. 82–83
 Corrado Levi, È andata così: Cronaca e critica dell'arte 1970-2008, Joseph Nechvatal intervistato nel suo studio a New York (1985–86), pp. 130–135
 Donald Kuspit, Del Atre Analogico al Arte Digital in Arte Digital Y Videoarte, Kuspit, D. ed., Consorcio del Circulo de Bellas Artes, Madrid, pp. 33–34 & pp. 210 – 212
 Robert C. Morgan, Nechvatal's Visionary Computer Virus, in Gruson, L. ed. 1993. Joseph Nechvatal: Computer Virus Project, Royal Saltworks at Arc-et-Senans: Fondation Claude-Nicolas Ledoux, pp. 8–15
 Sarah J. Rogers (ed), Body Mécanique: Artistic Explorations of Digital Realms, Columbus, Ohio, Wexner Center for the Arts, The Ohio State University
Edward A. Shanken, Art and Electronic Media. London: Phaidon, 2009. , pp. 42, 285, 160

External links 

 Joseph Nechvatal's website

1951 births
Living people
20th-century American painters
American male painters
21st-century American painters
21st-century American male artists
School of Visual Arts faculty
American conceptual artists
American digital artists
American expatriates in France
American experimental musicians
Artists from Chicago
Artists from New York (state)
Cellular automatists
Experimental composers
Genetic programming
American installation artists
Mass media theorists
New media artists
American noise musicians
Postmodern artists
Robotic art
American sound artists
Male classical composers
20th-century American printmakers
20th-century American composers
20th-century American male musicians
American contemporary painters
20th-century American male artists